Marissa Castelli (born August 20, 1990) is an American retired pair skater. With her skating partner, Mervin Tran, she is the 2017 U.S. national silver medalist.

With her former partner, Simon Shnapir, she is the 2013 Four Continents bronze medalist, the 2009 World Junior bronze medalist, and a two-time U.S. national champion (2013 & 2014). The pair won a bronze medal in the team event at the 2014 Winter Olympics.

Personal life
Castelli was born in Providence, Rhode Island, and graduated from Cranston High School West. She was enrolled at the Community College of Rhode Island before deciding to study sales and marketing at DeVry University. Her brother, Anthony Castelli, played football at Bryant University and her mother, Lori Castelli, is a figure skating coach.

Early career 
Castelli began skating at age three and enrolled in U.S. Figure Skating's Basic Skills program when she was about five. Early in her career, she competed as a single skater and also skated pairs with Brad Vigorito.

Partnership with Shnapir 
Castelli and Simon Shnapir teamed up in April 2006 and began training together in earnest in June. They trained in Boston, coached by Bobby Martin, Carrie Wall (technical), Mark Mitchell (in-betweens, polishing), and Peter Johansson (throws). Castelli broke Shnapir's nose once while they were practicing the twist.

Castelli/Shnapir qualified for the 2008 Junior Grand Prix Final and placed sixth. The pair won the bronze medal at the 2009 World Junior Championships.

2009–2010 season 
In the 2009–2010 season, Castelli was off the ice for a month after she collided with an Italian while she was skating backwards and landed on his blade, resulting in 15 stitches to her inner thigh. The pair placed tenth on the senior level at the 2010 U.S. Championships and were sent to the 2010 Four Continents Championships where they also finished tenth.

2012–2013 season 
In 2012, Castelli/Shnapir split up for a month but decided to recommit to their partnership. They won gold at the 2012 Ice Challenge and then won bronze, their first Grand Prix medal, at the 2012 NHK Trophy. They won their first national title at the 2013 U.S. Championships. They were assigned to the 2013 Four Continents and won the bronze medal.

2013–2014 season 
Castelli/Shnapir won their second national title at the 2014 U.S. Championships and were named in the U.S. team to the 2014 Winter Olympics, held in February in Sochi, Russia. They won a bronze medal in the team event and placed 9th in the pairs event. In March, Castelli/Shnapir finished 11th at the 2014 World Championships in Saitama, Japan. They announced the end of their partnership on May 7, 2014.

Partnership with Tran 
On June 10, 2014, Castelli announced that she and Canada's Mervin Tran had formed a partnership which would train mainly in Montreal under Bruno Marcotte and to a lesser extent at the Skating Club of Boston under Bobby Martin. It was also announced that he was awaiting release from Skate Canada, indicating that they might compete for the United States.

2016–2017 season 
Tran sustained a concussion in August 2016. After winning bronze at the 2016 CS Autumn Classic International, the pair appeared at two Grand Prix events, placing 7th at the 2016 Skate America and 5th at the 2016 Trophée de France. Castelli accidentally struck Tran with her elbow during training in late December.

Programs

With Tran

With Shnapir

Competitive highlights
GP: Grand Prix; CS: Challenger Series; JGP: Junior Grand Prix

With Tran

Pairs career with Shnapir

Singles career

References

External links

 
 Marissa Castelli / Mervin Tran at IceNetwork
 

American female pair skaters
1990 births
Living people
Sportspeople from Providence, Rhode Island
Sportspeople from Cranston, Rhode Island
World Junior Figure Skating Championships medalists
Four Continents Figure Skating Championships medalists
Figure skaters at the 2014 Winter Olympics
Medalists at the 2014 Winter Olympics
Olympic medalists in figure skating
Olympic bronze medalists for the United States in figure skating
21st-century American women
20th-century American women